The Nanyang Girls' High School Chinese Orchestra (NYCO) was founded in 1976, with the aim of promoting the appreciation of Chinese music and of grooming outstanding musicians.

Today, the orchestra is made up of approximately 100 members with a wide range of Chinese orchestral instruments, and holds a repertoire that ranges from full orchestral works and concertos to chamber and solo works.

The orchestra performs extensively in public concerts as well as school functions, NYCO also holds biennial concerts planned and implemented by the orchestra itself. 

It has also received outstanding results in national competitions, including the prestigious Gold with Honours awards at the 2005, 2007, 2009 and 2011 Singapore Youth Festival Central Judging, ever since the Gold with Honours award was implemented. Nanyang Chinese Orchestra was also the first Chinese Orchestra to be honoured with this award.

The orchestra participated in the Australian International Music Festival 2011, in which it attained the Gold award.

After the modification of the Singapore Youth Festival, the orchestra obtained a Certificate of Distinction at the 2013, 2015,2017 and 2019 Singapore Youth Festival Arts Presentation.

Conductor
The orchestra is directed by Singapore Chinese Orchestra conducting assistant and diyin sheng musician Lim Kiong Pin (林向斌).

Instructors

References

External links
NYCO
Cello Bass section
Dizi section
Pipa section
Xianyue section
Yangqin Percussion section

Musical groups established in 1977
Singaporean orchestras
Chinese orchestras